Nine Perfect Strangers is an American drama streaming television miniseries based on the 2018 novel of the same name by Liane Moriarty. Created by David E. Kelley who also developed the series alongside John-Henry Butterworth, the series premiered on August 18, 2021, on Hulu.

Premise
Nine strangers from the city gather for a 10-day retreat at Tranquillum House, a health and wellness resort in the fictional town of Cabrillo, California, which promises to transform and heal the guests who stay there. The resort is not what it seems to be, and the guests are about to discover many secrets about each other and the resort's host. One of the controversies arising between the guests and resort director Masha starts when she tells them during a meal conducted at a large table that they are all given a psychoactive drug, namely Psylocybin, in very small but relevant doses in their food without their prior consent or even knowledge, about which the guests are upset and assume it to be a crime.

Cast and characters

Main

 Nicole Kidman as Masha Dmitrichenko, the founder of a wellness resort called Tranquillum House
 Melissa McCarthy as Frances Welty, a novelist struggling with her professional and personal life
 Michael Shannon as Napoleon Marconi, Heather's husband and Zoe's father, a high school teacher grieving the death of his son
 Luke Evans as Lars Lee, a man who comes to the resort with a hidden agenda
 Samara Weaving as Jessica Chandler, a social media influencer and Ben's wife
 Asher Keddie as Heather Marconi, Napoleon's wife and Zoe's mother, mourning the death of her son
 Melvin Gregg as Ben Chandler, Jessica's wealthy lottery winner husband
 Tiffany Boone as Delilah, a devoted employee at Tranquillum House
 Manny Jacinto as Yao, Masha's right-hand man at Tranquillum House
 Grace Van Patten as Zoe Marconi, Napoleon and Heather's daughter, grieving the death of her twin brother
 Zoe Terakes as Glory, another employee at Tranquillum House
 Regina Hall as Carmel Schneider, a single mother whose husband left her for a younger woman
 Bobby Cannavale as Tony Hogburn, a former American football tight end struggling with his drug addiction

Special guest star
 Ben Falcone as Paul Drabble, a man who catfished Frances and left her heartbroken

Recurring

 Hal Cumpston as Zach Marconi, Napoleon and Heather's deceased son

Production

Development
On May 1, 2019, it was reported that Hulu had given the production a straight-to-series order. The limited series was created by David E. Kelley who also developed the series alongside John-Henry Butterworth who also served as executive producers alongside Nicole Kidman, Per Saari, Bruna Papandrea, Steve Hutensky, and Casey Haver. Production companies involved with the limited series are Made Up Stories, Blossom Films, and Endeavor Content. On January 7, 2020, Melissa McCarthy joined the miniseries as an executive producer. On July 29, 2020, it was announced Jonathan Levine was set to direct all eight episodes of the limited series as well as serve as an executive producer, while Gillian Bohrer joined the series as producer. Yves Bélanger served as cinematographer.

Casting
Alongside the initial series announcement, it was reported that Nicole Kidman was cast in a lead role. In addition to her executive producing announcement, Melissa McCarthy had also joined the cast in a starring role. On May 27, 2020, Manny Jacinto joined the main cast. In June 2020, Asher Keddie and Luke Evans were cast in starring roles. In July 2020, Melvin Gregg, Samara Weaving, Grace Van Patten, Tiffany Boone and Michael Shannon joined the main cast.<ref>{{cite web|url=https://deadline.com/2020/07/samara-weaving-cast-nine-perfect-strangers-hulu-limited-series-1202985972/|title=Samara Weaving Joins Nine Perfect Strangers'] Hulu Limited Series|work=Deadline Hollywood|first=Nellie|last=Andreeva|date=July 15, 2020|access-date=July 15, 2020|archive-date=May 19, 2021|archive-url=https://web.archive.org/web/20210519022118/https://deadline.com/2020/07/samara-weaving-cast-nine-perfect-strangers-hulu-limited-series-1202985972/|url-status=live}}</ref> In August 2020, Regina Hall and Bobby Cannavale were cast in starring roles. On October 22, 2020, Hal Cumpston joined the cast in a recurring role. On November 19, 2020, Zoe Terakes was cast in a recurring role.

 Filming 
On July 8, 2020, Evans revealed that filming would take place in Australia. He also revealed that all actors were required to quarantine for fourteen days in the city of arrival in Australia, due to regulations imposed by the Australian government in response to the COVID-19 pandemic. Furthermore, all actors were required to be tested during the quarantine before filming could begin. Principal photography began on August 10, 2020, in Byron Bay, New South Wales. On December 21, 2020, Kidman announced that filming had wrapped.

Kidman met most of the other nine actors right when filming their first scene together, and stayed in character as Masha during production.

Episodes

 Release 
Hulu released a first-look trailer for the show during the 93rd Academy Awards airing on ABC on April 25, 2021. The miniseries premiered on Hulu on August 18, 2021, with the first three episodes released at once, and a new episode released weekly thereafter. The finale was released on September 22, 2021. Outside of the United States and China, the series was released on Prime Video. It was broadcast free-to-air in Australia on SBS TV in October/November 2022.

 Reception 
The review aggregator website Rotten Tomatoes reports a 61% approval rating with an average rating of 6.1/10, based on 106 critic reviews. The critics consensus reads, "A meandering mystery may muddle its impact, but strong performances across the board from its eclectic ensemble mean Nine Perfect Strangers'' is never less than watchable." Metacritic, which uses a weighted average, assigned a score of 54 out of 100 based on 35 critics, indicating "mixed or average reviews".

On August 24, 2021, it was reported that the limited series' premiere was the most-watched Hulu original at the time.

References

External links
 
 

2021 American television series debuts
2021 American television series endings
2020s American drama television miniseries
2020s American mystery television series
American thriller television series
Hulu original programming
Television series by Made Up Stories
Television series created by David E. Kelley
Television shows based on Australian novels
Television shows filmed in Australia
Television shows set in California